The Santa Marta white-fronted capuchin (Cebus malitiosus) is a species of gracile capuchin monkey from Colombia.  It was formerly considered a subspecies of the Cebus albifrons or a synonym of the Colombian white-faced capuchin (C. capucinus), but Mittermeier and Rylands elevated it to a species in 2013, following previous work by Rylands, Hershkovitz, Cooper and Hernandez-Camacho.  The IUCN follows this taxonomy.

The Santa Marta white-fronted capuchin range is restricted to forests near the northwest base of Sierra de Santa Marta in northern Colombia.

References

Capuchin monkeys
Mammals of Colombia
Mammals described in 1909
Taxa named by Daniel Giraud Elliot
Primates of South America
Sierra Nevada de Santa Marta